Gerald Lincoln "Gerry" Bron (1 March 1933 – 18 June 2012) was an English record producer and band manager.

Early life and education
Bron was born in Hendon, Middlesex, into a Jewish family, the elder brother of actress Eleanor Bron. Their father, Sydney, shortened the family's surname to "Bron" from "Bronstein" when founding Bron's Orchestral Service, which was purported to be the largest sheet music supplier in the UK. After spending two years at Trinity College of Music, Bron joined Bron's Orchestral Service in 1950.

Career

Bron's Orchestral Service
Bron's Orchestral Service expanded into music publishing, and began working with American publishers like Aaron Schroeder who were seeking representation in the UK. One of the first acts that Bron was responsible for was Gene Pitney. This business relationship led to Bron and Pitney discussing making records together and Bron began producing all the demos for the publishing company.

Bron also began managing acts, including Gene Pitney, The Bonzo Dog Doo-Dah Band, Marianne Faithfull, Manfred Mann, Colosseum, Osibisa, and Uriah Heep.

Bronze Records

In 1971, after having produced Uriah Heep's album ...Very 'Eavy ...Very 'Umble at Lansdowne Studios in London, Bron founded Bronze Records, an independent record label which could serve as the band's label for future releases. The label would become home to many of the bands Bron was managing and more, including Manfred Mann's Earth Band, Osibisa, Paladin, The Real Kids, Sally Oldfield, Motörhead, The Damned, Girlschool, Bronz and Hawkwind.

In the mid-70s, Bron's record label issued an album by Gene Pitney, along with a single, "Blue Angel", which became a hit in the UK and Australia. Later, Bron produced Manfred Mann's hit singles "Ha! Ha! Said the Clown", "My Name Is Jack" and "Fox on the Run". These were followed by albums produced for Colosseum and Uriah Heep.

Roundhouse Recording Studios
In 1975, Bron founded a recording studio next door to the famed Roundhouse performance venue in London, appropriately naming it Roundhouse Recording Studios.

Selected album production credits
Motörhead
Uriah Heep
...Very 'Eavy ...Very 'Umble
Salisbury
Demons & Wizards
Look at Yourself
The Magician's Birthday
Sweet Freedom
Wonderworld
Return to Fantasy
Innocent Victim
Firefly
Fallen Angel
Conquest
Bonzo Dog Doo-Dah Band
Gorilla
The Doughnut In Granny's Greenhouse
Kim Mitchell
Akimbo Alogo

Selected single production credits
Manfred Mann
Ha! Ha! Said the Clown
My Name is Jack
Fox On The Run
Ragamuffin Man
Gene Pitney
Something's Gotten Hold of My Heart
Juicy Lucy
Who Do You Love?
Richard Barnes
Take To The Mountains
Go North
Kim Mitchell 12 inch remix and radio single for "Go For Soda" from the album Akimbo Alogo

See also
Bronze Records

References

External links
Bronze Records
Interview with Bron 

1933 births
2012 deaths
English music managers
English record producers
English Jews
People from Hendon
Place of death missing
20th-century English businesspeople